Valentina Sergeyevna Ivanov (born 27 March 2001) is a New Zealand tennis player, although she has lived in Sydney since she was two years old.

Ivanov's mother Oksana (née Yarikova) was a member of the Uzbekistan Fed Cup team in 1995 and 1997, being joined in the latter by her younger sister Irina. The Uzbekistan team captain that year was Oksana's future husband (and Valentina's father), Sergey Ivanov. Valentina was coached by both parents until she was 12.

On the ITF Junior Circuit, Ivanov has a career-high combined ranking of 85, achieved on 2 April 2018.

Tennis career

Junior highlights
Ivanov won two Grade-4 singles titles in 2017, and five junior doubles titles in 2017 and 2018, four with Australian Amber Marshall and one, the Grade-2 2017 Lee Duk Hee Cup Chuncheon International Junior Tennis Championships, with Supapitch Kuearum.

2019
Ivanov made her WTA Tour main-draw debut as a wildcard, with fellow New Zealand junior Elys Ventura, in the ASB Classic in Auckland. They lost in the first round of doubles to the eventual runners-up, Paige Hourigan and Taylor Townsend, after Ivanov had defeated Hourigan in the first round of singles qualifying, repeating the result of the New Zealand Championships final. She lost in the second qualifying round to Bibiane Schoofs. She then came through qualifying to reach the first round of the girls' singles draw at the Australian Open, where she lost to the fifth seed Mananchaya Sawangkaew. She also lost in the first round of doubles.

Ivanov's first senior title came in Port Pirie, South Australia, in February, when she and Marshall defeated the top seeds Jennifer Elie and Alicia Smith in the semifinals before beating Patricia Böntgen and Lisa Mays in the doubles final. A poor run of form in qualifying for singles main draws was only slightly alleviated by reaching the doubles semifinal at a tournament in Heraklion. However, she made her Fed Cup debut for New Zealand in June in the best possible manner, defeating Meheq Khokhar of Pakistan, 6–0, 6–0. She won two singles and three doubles matches as New Zealand finished a disappointing fourth in the tournament.

Although she and Mylène Halemai reached the doubles semifinal of her first tournament when back in Europe, at Alkmaar, she got past the first round of doubles only once more in the season, whilst also getting to the singles main draw only once more in Europe. It took until her last event for the year, in Tucson, Arizona, before she got any further, making it to the quarter-finals but having to default through injury.

2020
Ivanov began the year at the Auckland Open where her original wildcard into qualifying was upgraded to one in the main draw. Ranked 1014 at the time of entry, she was not disgraced when going down in straight sets to 63rd ranked Jil Teichmann, 4–6, 3–6, having broken the Swiss player's serve in the second set.

She was unbeaten in three singles matches when New Zealand hosted one pool in the 2020 Fed Cup Asia/Oceania Zone Group II in Wellington, before heading back to UC Berkeley to continue her studies. She didn't play again before international play was suspended in early March because of the COVID-19 pandemic, and soon afterwards returned to Sydney. Her only subsequent competitive matches were in UTR tournaments in her home city, reaching one final after beating Destanee Aiava in a round-robin match.

ITF finals

Doubles: 3 (3 titles)

Fed Cup/Billie Jean King Cup participation

Singles

Doubles

References

External links
 
 

2001 births
Living people
New Zealand female tennis players
New Zealand people of Russian descent
Sportspeople from Christchurch
Tennis players from Sydney
Tennis players at the 2018 Summer Youth Olympics
21st-century New Zealand women
California Golden Bears women's tennis players